The simurgh (also spelled simorgh, simorg, simurg, simoorg, simorq or simourv) is a benevolent, mythical bird in Persian mythology and literature. It is sometimes equated with other mythological birds such as the phoenix ( quqnūs) and the humā, though it must be understood as a completely different mythological creature of its own. The figure can be found in all periods of Iranian art and literature and is also evident in the iconography  of Georgia, medieval Armenia, the Eastern Roman Empire, and other regions that were within the realm of Persian cultural influence.

Etymology
The Persian word sīmurğ derives from Middle Persian sēnmurw<ref name="Iranica">Schmidt, Hanns-Peter (2002). Simorgh. in Encyclopedia Iranica.</ref> (and earlier sēnmuruγ), also attested in Pazend texts as sīna-mrū. The Middle Persian word comes from Avestan  "the bird Saēna", originally a raptor, likely an eagle, falcon, or sparrowhawk, as can be deduced from the etymological cognate Sanskrit śyenaḥ (श्येनः) "raptor, eagle, bird of prey", which also appears as a divine figure. Saēna is also a personal name. The word was lent to Armenian as siramarg 'peacock'.

On the other hand, the phrase sī murğ means "thirty birds" in Persian; this has been used by Attar of Nishapur in his symbolic story of The Conference of the Birds, the frame story of which employs a play on the name.

Mythology

Form and function

The simurgh is depicted in Iranian art as a winged creature in the shape of a bird, gigantic enough to carry off an elephant or a whale. It appears as a peacock with the head of a dog and the claws of a lion – sometimes, however, also with a human face. The simurgh is inherently benevolent and unambiguously female. Being part mammal, she suckles her young. The simurgh has teeth. It has an enmity towards snakes, and its natural habitat is a place with plenty of water. Its feathers are said to be the colour of copper, and though it was originally described as being a dog-bird, later it was shown with either the head of a man or a dog.

"Si-", the first element in the name, has been connected in folk etymology to Modern Persian si ("thirty"). Although this prefix is not historically related to the origin of the name simurgh, "thirty" has nonetheless been the basis for legends incorporating that number – for instance, that the simurgh was as large as thirty birds or had thirty colours (siræng). Other suggested etymologies include Pahlavi sin murgh ("eagle bird") and Avestan saeno merego ("eagle").

Iranian legends consider the bird so old that it had seen the destruction of the world three times over. The simurgh learned so much by living so long that it is thought to possess the knowledge of all the ages. In one legend, the simurgh was said to live 1,700 years before plunging itself into flames (much like the phoenix).

The simurgh was considered to purify the land and waters and hence bestow fertility. The creature represented the union between the Earth and the sky, serving as mediator and messenger between the two. The simurgh roosted in Gaokerena, the Hōm (Avestan: Haoma) Tree of Life, which stands in the middle of the world sea (Vourukasha). The plant is potent medicine and is called all-healing, and the seeds of all plants are deposited on it. When the simurgh took flight, the leaves of the tree of life shook, making all the seeds of every plant fall out. These seeds floated around the world on the winds of Vayu-Vata and the rains of Tishtrya, in cosmology taking root to become every type of plant that ever lived and curing all the illnesses of mankind.

The relationship between the simurgh and Hōm is extremely close. Like the simurgh, Hōm is represented as a bird, a messenger, and the essence of purity that can heal any illness or wound. Hōm – appointed as the first priest – is the essence of divinity, a property it shares with the simurgh. The Hōm is in addition the vehicle of farr(ah) (MP: khwarrah, Avestan: khvarenah, kavaēm kharēno) ("divine glory" or "fortune"). Farrah in turn represents the divine mandate that was the foundation of a king's authority.

It appears as a bird resting on the head or shoulder of would-be kings and clerics, indicating Ormuzd's acceptance of that individual as his divine representative on Earth. For the commoner, Bahram wraps fortune/glory "around the house of the worshipper, for wealth in cattle, like the great bird Saena, and as the watery clouds cover the great mountains" (Yasht 14.41, cf. the rains of Tishtrya above). Like the simurgh, farrah is also associated with the waters of Vourukasha (Yasht 19.51, 56–57). In Yašt 12.17 Simorgh's (Saēna's) tree stands in the middle of the sea Vourukaša, it has good and potent medicine and is called all-healing, and the seeds of all plants are deposited on it.

In the Shahnameh
The simurgh made its most famous appearance in Ferdowsi's epic Shahnameh (Book of Kings), where its involvement with Prince Zal is described. According to the Shahnameh, Zal, the son of Saam, was born albino.  When Saam saw his albino son, he assumed that the child was the spawn of devils, and abandoned the infant on the mountain Alborz.

The child's cries were heard by the tender-hearted simurgh, who lived atop this peak, and she retrieved the child and raised him as her own. Zal was taught much wisdom from the loving simurgh, who has all knowledge, but the time came when he grew into a man and yearned to rejoin the world of men. Though the simurgh was terribly saddened, she gave him three golden feathers which he was to burn if he ever needed her assistance.

Upon returning to his kingdom, Zal fell in love and married the beautiful Rudaba. When it came time for their son to be born, the labor was prolonged and terrible; Zal was certain that his wife would die in labour. Rudaba was near death when Zal decided to summon the simurgh. The simurgh appeared and instructed him upon how to perform a cesarean section thus saving Rudaba and the child, who became one of the greatest Persian heroes, Rostam.

Simurgh also shows up in the story of the Seven Trials of Esfandiyar in the latter's 5th labor. After killing the wicked enchantress, Esfandiyar fights a simurgh, and despite the simurgh's many powers, Esfandiyar strikes it in the neck, decapitating it. The simurgh's offspring then rise to fight Esfandiyar, but they, too, are slain.

In Sufi poetry

In classical and modern Persian literature the simorḡ is frequently mentioned, particularly as a metaphor for God in Sufi mysticism.  In the 12th century Conference of the Birds, Iranian Sufi poet Farid ud-Din Attar wrote of a band of pilgrim birds in search of the simurgh. In the poem, the birds of the world gather to decide who is to be their king, as they have none. The hoopoe, the wisest of them all, suggests that they should find the legendary simorgh, a mythical Persian bird roughly equivalent to the western phoenix. The hoopoe leads the birds, each of whom represent a human fault which prevents man from attaining enlightenment. When the group of thirty birds finally reach the dwelling place of the simorgh, all they find is a lake in which they see their own reflection. This scene employs a pun on the Persian expression for "thirty birds" (si morgh).

The phrase also appears three times in Rumi's Masnavi, e.g. in Book VI, Story IX: "The nest of the sī murğ is beyond Mount Qaf" (as translated by E.H. Whinfield).

Through cultural assimilation the simurgh was introduced to the Arabic-speaking world, where the concept was conflated with other Arabic mythical birds such as the ghoghnus, a bird having some mythical relation with the date palm, and further developed as the rukh (the origin of the English word "roc").
Representations of simurgh were adopted in early Umayyad art and coinage.

In Kurdish folklore
Simurgh is shortened to "sīmir" in the Kurdish language. The scholar C. V. Trever quotes two Kurdish folktales about the bird. These versions go back to the common stock of Iranian simorḡ stories. In one of the folk tales, a hero rescues simurgh's offspring by killing a snake that was crawling up the tree to feed upon them.  As a reward, the simurgh gives him three of her feathers which the hero can use to call for her help by burning them.  Later, the hero uses the feathers, and the simurgh carries him to a distant land. In the other tale, the simurgh carries the hero out of the netherworld; here the simurgh feeds its young with its teats, a trait which agrees with the description of the simurgh in the Middle Persian book of Zadspram. In another tale, simurgh feeds the hero on the journey while the hero feeds simurgh with pieces of sheep's fat.

In popular culture
Salman Rushdie's first novel, Grimus'' (1975), is an anagram of Simurg.
Simurgh is the name of a proxy tool introduced in 2009 that helps residents of Iran avoid government censorship of websites.
 The Crystal Simorgh is an award given by Fajr International Film Festival.
 The Simurgh is the name of one of the Endbringers in the 2011 Worm (web serial).

Gallery

See also
 Anqa, Arabian mythological bird identified with the Simurgh
 Anzû (older reading: Zû), Mesopotamian monster
 Chamrosh, Persian mythological bird 
 Chimera, Greek mythological hybrid monster
 Fenghuang, mythological bird of East Asia
 Zhar Ptica, bird in Russian mythology parallel to the Phoenix
 Garuda, Indian mythological bird
 Griffin or griffon, Greek lion-bird hybrid
 Konrul, Turkish mythological hybrid bird
 Lamassu, Assyrian deity, bull/lion-eagle-human hybrid
 Luan, Chinese mythological bird related to the phoenix, whose name is often translated as "simurgh"
 Hybrid creatures in mythology
 Huma bird, Iranian mythical bird
 Nue, Japanese legendary creature
 Oksoko, Slavic mythological double-headed eagle
 Pegasus, winged stallion in Greek mythology
 Pixiu or Pi Yao, Chinese mythical creature
 Roc, Arab and Persian legendary bird, the opposite of Anqa
 Shahbaz (bird), Persian mythological bird
 Simargl, a related being in Slavic mythology
 Sphinx, Greek mythical creature with lion's body and human head
 Ziz, giant griffin-like bird in Jewish mythology

Notes

References

External links

Female legendary creatures
Legendary birds
Mythological hybrids
Mythological monsters
National symbols of Iran
Persian legendary creatures
Roc (mythology)
Shahnameh characters
Phoenix birds